Cinnamon June Chaney (born 10 January 1969) is a former association football player who represented New Zealand at international level.

Chaney made her Football Ferns debut in a 0–0 draw with a Hawaii select VII on 12 December 1987 and ended her international career with 29 caps and 2 goals to her credit.

Chaney represented New Zealand at the Women's World Cup finals in China in 1991 playing 2 group games; a 0–3 loss to Denmark and a 0–4 loss to Norway.

References

External links

1969 births
Living people
New Zealand women's international footballers
New Zealand women's association footballers
1991 FIFA Women's World Cup players
Women's association football defenders